Many naval bases were located in and around Egypt in the ancient times of this world. The particular naval base of Peru-nefer was one of the bases established in the Eighteenth Dynasty of the New Kingdom of Egypt. Perunefer is, according to Manfred Bietak, identified with Tell el-Daba or Ezbet Helmy. Support for this theory comes from excavations and digs that were conducted around the area the naval base was believed to be.

Overview 
The pharaohs believed to be responsible for this 18th Dynasty naval base are Tuthmosis III (reigned 1479 – 1425 BCE) and Amenhotep II (reigned 1427–1401 BCE), located near the Nile Delta. According to Labib Habachi's research, Perunefer was located at Tell el-Daba and Qantir, which he identified with Avaris/Piramesse. These identifications were proved by the excavations of the Austrian Institute and the Pelizaeus Museum, Hildesheim respectively. Although this information is provided, no Eighteenth Dynasty remains were missing from the site. 
When military installations were made from the Eighteenth Dynasty, evidence was found in Perunefer's favor. Detailed work from Tuthmosis III and Amenhotep II were found in the form of paintings. These paintings were later to be known as the Minoan wall paintings. Along with these recent discoveries, two large harbor basins were found. Jean-Phiippe Goiran and Hervé Tronchère were the paleogeographers who found the evidence of the two harbours. These two men were specialists in the study of ancient harbours, and had access via the canals to the harbours. According to their evidence, they make the assumption that Perunefer accommodated hundreds of ships in the eighteenth dynasty. The first harbour was hard to date, but early evidence pointed to the time of Horemheb. Horemheb created a project to build a wall which covered access to the canal which was examined.  The second harbor was just beside a recently discovered Hyksos palace, probably belonging to Khyan, which hints at its date. It was found in a strange spot of the Nile channel, which was believed to have a seasonal lake from time to time. On the stela of King Kamose of the Seventeenth Dynasty, he mentions destroying hundreds of ships in a large basin, which leads us to believe that our second harbor of Perunefer would be located here.

The significance of Perunefer goes slightly beyond the Eighteenth Dynasty though. The harbours were still in use during the Nineteenth Dynasty, according to Papyrus Anastasi III.  An interesting fact about these particular harbours of Perunefer was that some evidence points to the fact that these were the basins in use around the time of the biblical character of Moses. The palaces involved and some of the pottery found were excavated around this area, and Tuthmosis III and Amenhotep II are mentioned along with that. Biatek actually was one of the historians involved with this project, and uncovered an even more interesting find. A pot was found that some believe was the pot that Moses could have used during that time.   Perunefer is very obscure and there is not much information about this ancient naval base. The Egyptians and their leaders found Perunefer to be of importance, and it continued to thrive.

All of the historic information of the naval base is primarily covered by the historian, Manfred Bietak, University of Vienna. In one of his most recent articles about Perunefer, he discusses more about the Minoan paintings and just how pharaonic Perunefer was. When the Austrian Archaeological Institute dug the site of Tell el-Daba, as discussed earlier, it was revealed that the site spanned thirteen acres. Two palaces were located on this land which had a unique taste. The Minoans used a lot of symbolism involving the bull. The bull shows up many times in these palaces and paintings, which were of high quality. According to Biatek, the existence of the hitherto enigmatic palace complexes were supported by the discovery. Keftiu ships were also found to be docked at Perunefer as according to the British Museum Papyrus 10056.

The location of Perunefer is believed to be at the site of Tell el-Daba. Tell el-Daba is located on the East end of the Nile River on the Delta. The map above shows the alleged location of Tell el-Daba, and the believed to be location of the naval base, Perunefer.  Other ports’ locations are also given on this map, and it seems as if Perunefer had one of the more desirable locations than nearly all of them. The other ports and their harbours are located out of the way of the Nile and more East than the Delta. Perunefer appears to be right on the Nile, and shows to be a good location for trade and a great location for civilizations to reside.

Perunefer is much more significant than the average port. This important naval base was used by two well known pharaohs and in use throughout the eighteenth and nineteenth dynasties. Manfred Biatek and other smaller historians helped to bring Perunefer to others, but it seems as if it didn't catch on. The Minoans, Egyptians, Moses, and many others are involved in the history of Perunefer.

References 
Kingdom Naval Base," Egyptian Archaeology 34 (2009), 15-17. | Manfred Bietak - Academia.edu. Accessed November 28, 2017. https://www.academia.edu/10074927/_Peru-nefer_The_Principal_New_Kingdom_Naval_Base_Egyptian_Archaeology_34_2009_15-17.
PhD, Bryant G. Wood. "New Discoveries at Rameses." Accessed November 28, 2017. http://www.biblearchaeology.org/post/2008/10/New-Discoveries-at-Rameses.aspx#Article.
Biatek, Manfred. “Minoan Presence in the Pharaonic Naval Base of “Peru-nefer”. Accessed November 28, 2017. https://www.researchgate.net/publication/260099051_Minoan_presence_in_the_pharaonic_naval_base_of_Peru-nefer

15th-century BC establishments in Egypt
Ports and harbours of Egypt
Pi-Ramesses
Thutmose III